Stephen McBurney (born  14 November 1967) is a former Australian rules football field umpire in the Australian Football League, and the most recent Australian Building and Construction Commissioner between February 2018 and February 2023.

In his umpiring career, he umpired 383 career games in the AFL, up to the completion of the 2011 AFL season.

McBurney was named the All Australian Umpire for the 2003 and 2007 seasons and umpired the AFL Grand Final in 2002, 2003, 2007 and 2009.

Footnotes

Australian Football League umpires
1967 births
Living people
Australian public servants